The 1963 New Mexico Lobos football team represented the University of New Mexico in the Western Athletic Conference (WAC) during the 1963 NCAA University Division football season.  In their fourth season under head coach Bill Weeks, the Lobos compiled a 6–4 record (3–1 against WAC opponents), finished second in the WAC, and outscored opponents, 177 to 143.

The team's statistical leaders included Stan Quintana with 221 passing yards, Bucky Stallings with 553 rushing yards, and Claude Ward with 181 receiving yards.

Schedule

References

New Mexico Lobos
New Mexico Lobos football seasons
New Mexico Lobos football